The following list includes all current and former arenas used by current and defunct teams playing in the National Basketball Association (NBA). Other information included in this list are arena locations, seating capacities, years opened, and in use.  

While there are 30 NBA teams, there are only 29 full-time arenas, as both Los Angeles teams, the Clippers and the Lakers, currently share Crypto.com Arena. However, the Clippers plan to open a new arena in Inglewood by 2024. The United Center has the highest capacity of any current NBA arena at 20,917. Madison Square Garden and Miami-Dade Arena are the only current arenas not to be named after a corporate sponsor; however, the latter is a temporary name while the Heat seek a new naming rights partner following the bankruptcy of FTX.

Current arenas

Map of current arenas

Future or proposed arenas

Former arenas

Defunct teams

Neutral venues

See also
National Basketball Association
List of basketball arenas
List of American Basketball Association arenas
List of current Major League Baseball stadiums
List of National Hockey League arenas
List of current National Football League stadiums
List of Major League Soccer stadiums
List of U.S. stadiums by capacity
List of NCAA Division I basketball arenas

References

External links

 Hoops Corner
 Inside Arenas
 NBA arenas on Ballparks.com

 
NBA
NBA
.NBA
venues